Rithuakhor is a village and gram panchayat in Sahjanwa tehsil in Gorakhpur district in the Indian state of Uttar Pradesh.This village belongs to janwar kshatriya caste.

Demographics
, according to the Indian census, the town had a population of 4091. Males constituted 53% of the population and females 47%. Sahjanwa had an average literacy rate of 57%, lower than the national average of 59.5%; male literacy was 70%, and female literacy was 43%. In Rithuakhor, 17% of the population was under 6 years of age. The primary language in the town, like other towns in eastern Uttar Pradesh, is Bhojpuri.

Industries
Rithuakor has a developing industrial area called GIDA. There are many factories in GIDA including Parle, powerlooms, plywood, and a jute mill (the second operational jute mill in India and the only one in Uttar Pradesh.

Transport
Rithuakhor is near the railway station in Sahjanwa, which is well connected with Lucknow and Gorakhpur. The town also touches National Highway 28.

References 

Cities and towns in Gorakhpur district

bpy:সাহজানৱা
it:Rithuakhor
pl:Rithuakhor
pt:Rithuakhor
vi:Rithuakhor
zh:萨赫詹瓦